Bangladesh Association of Librarians, Information Scientists and Documentalists (BALID) is a non-political and professional association of librarians and Information scientists of Bangladesh.

Birth of BALID

BALID was founded as "Bangladesh Young Librarians, Information Scientists and Documentalists (BAYLID) on January 23, 1986 by Bangladeshi young library professionals who wished to establish an association to develop the libraries and its professionals. Its inauguration was declared on the same date at "Sabuj Chattar" (Green Premises) of Modern Language Institute of Dhaka University, Bangladesh.

Later the name was changed to "Bangladesh Association of Librarians, Information Scientists and Documentalists (BALID)". In the Bengali language the name is (বাংলাদেশ গ্রন্থাগারিক ও তথ্যায়নবিদ সমিতি - বেলিড) .

Aims and objectives

To serve Library, Information and Documentation centers to develop these for all the citizen of the country.
To help to develop the professional status of Librarians, Information Scientists and Documentalists.
To help to promote the professionals proficiency.
To take care of welfare and professional interest of the members.
To help the professionals to co-operate with various libraries, information and documentation centres.
To make the platform for co-operation with other relevant local, regional and international organizations.
Take part in participation in socio-economic activities and help to other same groups.

External links
Bangladesh Association of Librarians, Information Scientists and Documentalists Official site

Professional associations based in Bangladesh
Library associations
Organizations established in 1986
1986 establishments in Bangladesh
Learned societies of Bangladesh